Giorgi Ladaria (born 9 September 1979) is a retired Georgian professional football player. He also holds Russian citizenship.

Ladaria made a single appearance in the Russian Premier League with FC Chernomorets Novorossiysk.

External links
Profile at Footballfacts.ru

1979 births
Living people
Footballers from Georgia (country)
Expatriate footballers from Georgia (country)
Expatriate footballers in Ukraine
Russian Premier League players
FC Chernomorets Novorossiysk players
FC Obolon-Brovar Kyiv players
Association football forwards